Finchley Road railway station was built by the Midland Railway (MR) in 1868 on its extension to St. Pancras. Situated at the north end of the Belsize Tunnels, it served the newly developed area of St John's Wood.

For a short period from 1878 until 1880, the MR operated the Super Outer Circle service through the station from St. Pancras to Earl's Court Underground station via tracks through Cricklewood, then using the Dudding Hill Line to South Acton and Hammersmith.

The station was rebuilt in 1884 and closed in 1927. Very little of the station buildings other than rubble remain, though the island platform's contours still determine the track layout. As of February 2009 the station area was being offered for sale with a view to redevelopment.

The present-day Finchley Road & Frognal railway station is on the old London and North Western Railway line from Willesden to Camden Town, which crosses the MR line a little way north.

References

External links 
 London's Abandoned Stations - Finchley Road

Disused railway stations in the London Borough of Camden
Railway stations in Great Britain opened in 1868
Railway stations in Great Britain closed in 1927
Former Midland Railway stations